Lawrence Clement Windom (October 5, 1872 – November 14, 1957) was an American film director. He worked in theater before joining the film industry. In 1918 he signed a deal with World Pictures.

Filmography

References

External links

1872 births
1957 deaths
American film directors
Silent film directors